Gwangju Health University (GHU) is a private bachelor's degree-granting community college located in Gwangju Metropolitan City, South Korea. Established in 1972, GHU, has received national accreditation by the Ministry of Education as a World Class College in 2013, rated "Level A" for Structure Reformation Evaluation in 2016, and rated "Level S" for Specialized Education since 2015. There are over 4,000 students attending one of fourteen academic programs on campus. The academic programs at GHU focus on humanities and social sciences and the natural sciences. Various 2-year associate degree programs, 3-year associate degree programs, 4-year bachelor's degree program, and intensive study programs for a bachelor's degree (전공심화과정) are offered at GHU.

GHU Accreditation
2018 University Reform and Institutional Autonomy by the Ministry of Education (South Korea)

2017 University Reform and Institutional Autonomy by the Ministry of Education

2016 Level A rating for Structure Reformation Evaluation by the Ministry of Education

2015 Level S rating for Specialized Education by the Ministry of Education

2013 World Class College rating by the Ministry of Education

GHU Milestones
2016 GHU was awarded the highest recognition for being a Specialized College of Korea by the Ministry of Education.

2015 GHU was evaluated as “Grade A” by the Ministry of Education for its structural organization.

2015 GHU was awarded the highest recognition for being a Specialized College by the Ministry of Education.

2014 GHU was selected to run a Foreign Language School for the Summer Universiade Gwangju 2015.

2013 GHU was evaluated with the highest marks for Teacher Education Evaluation Systems by the Ministry of Education.

2011 GHU changed its name to Gwangju Health University.

2010 GHU was awarded “Excellence” in Higher Education Capability Enhancement Projects by the Korean Council for College Education.

2006 GHU was recognized for its Customized Education Support Projects by the Ministry of Education.

2005 GHU was recognized for its Customized Education Support Projects by the Ministry of Education.

2000 GHU was recognized for Excellence in its Specialization Programs by the Ministry of Education.

1971 GHU was given approval from the government to establish itself as the Speer Women's Technical School.

Academics 
Two-Year associate degree Program in Humanities and Social Sciences
 Department of Social Welfare

Two-Year associate degree Programs in the Natural Sciences
 Department of Food & Nutrition
 Department of Skin Care & Beauty

Three-Year associate degree Program in Humanities and Social Sciences
 Department of Early Childhood Education

Three-Year associate degree Programs in the Natural Sciences
 Department of Clinical Pathology
 Department of Dental Hygiene
 Department of Physical Therapy
 Department of Radiological Technology
 Department of Dental Laboratory Technology
 Department of Ophthalmic Optics
 Department of Emergency Medical Technology
 Department of Health Administration
 Department of Hospital Information Management

Four-Year bachelor's degree Program in the Natural Sciences
 Department of Nursing

Intensive Study Programs for bachelor's degree
 Department of Clinical Pathology
 Department of Dental Hygiene
 Department of Physical Therapy
 Department of Radiological Technology
 Department of Dental Laboratory Technology
 Department of Ophthalmic Optics
 Department of Emergency Medical Technology
 Department of Early Childhood Education

GHU Facilities
GHU has a multifunctional residence hall, Samuel Student Residence Hall, which can provide housing for 600 students including international students.
GHU has two on-campus coffee shops.
GHU has a large athletic field.

GHU Office of Global Affairs Programs
GHU Pioneer: 2 week overseas volunteer program e.g., Mongolia, the Philippines and Cambodia
Global Language Program: 6 week on-campus English conversation and/or TOEIC-based classes
TOEIC Camp: 4 week full-time intensive TOEIC-based classes during summer break
Overseas Language Training: 4 weeks of English language training overseas e.g., the Philippines, Ireland and Australia
GHU Global Field Study: 16 week overseas English language training and workplace internship e.g., the US, Australia and Ireland

See also 
 List of colleges and universities in South Korea
 Education in South Korea

External links 
 

Vocational education in South Korea
Universities and colleges in Gwangju
Gwangsan District
Educational institutions established in 1972
1972 establishments in South Korea
Schools in Gwangju